Acacia loxophylla is a shrub of the genus Acacia and the subgenus Plurinerves that is endemic to an area of south western Australia.

Description
Like most species of Acacia it has phyllodes rather than true leaves. The seed pods that form after flowering are covered in white hairs and curves to linear.

Taxonomy
The species was first formally described bu the botanist George Bentham in 1855 as a part of the work Plantae Muellerianae: Mimoseae as published in the journal Linnaea: ein Journal für die Botanik in ihrem ganzen Umfange, oder Beiträge zur Pflanzenkunde. It was reclassified as Racosperma loxophyllum by Leslie Pedley in 2003 then transferred back to genus Acacia in 2006.

Distribution
It is native to an area in the Wheatbelt, Great Southern and Goldfields-Esperance regions of Western Australia where it is found growing in sandy to loamy soils. It has a scattered distribution from around Pingelly in the north west and near Ongerup in the south.

See also
 List of Acacia species

References

loxophylla
Acacias of Western Australia
Taxa named by George Bentham
Plants described in 1855